is a Japanese actor. He appeared in more than 40 films since 2001.

Selected filmography

Films

Television

References

External links 

1990 births
Living people
Japanese male television actors
Japanese male child actors
Japanese male film actors
Male actors from Tokyo